Roger Williams University (RWU) is a private university in Bristol, Rhode Island. Founded in 1956, it was named for theologian and Rhode Island cofounder Roger Williams. The school enrolls over 5,000 students and employs over 480 academic staff.

History
The university’s operations date to 1919, when Northeastern University in Boston, Massachusetts, opened a branch campus in the YMCA building in Providence, Rhode Island.  In 1940, the YMCA board of directors began directing the school, and the YMCA Institute granted its first associate's degrees in 1948.  In 1956, the institute received a state charter to become a two-year, degree-granting institution under the name of Roger Williams Junior College.

During the 1960s, Roger Williams College began granting bachelor’s degrees.  Needing a larger campus, the college purchased  of waterfront land and moved its main campus to Bristol in 1969. (RWU continues to operate a branch campus in Providence.) In 1989 new president Dr. Natale A. Sicuro initiated the Roger Williams Plan for the 90s, and became concurrently the president of the newly established Roger Williams School of Law and, in 1992, led the name change of Roger Williams College to Roger Williams University. RWU celebrated its 50th anniversary in 2006.

Ioannis Miaoulis was appointed the eleventh president of Roger Williams University in 2019. Miaoulis previously served as both the president and director of the Boston Museum of Science since 2003 and brings a STEM philosophy to the university as he seeks to guide the university's mission and commitment in providing education through community-engaged learning and civic scholarship.

In 2012, Roger Williams University initiated a tuition freeze in which all entering freshmen would have a guarantee that their tuition would not increase for the next four years. The university renewed this promise for all freshmen entering in fall of 2015. As a result of this program, enrollment at the university has been steadily increasing, while enrollment at many peer institutions has been decreasing.  In 2019, the university terminated this policy.

Academics
Roger Williams University enrolls approximately 3,800 undergraduate and 850 graduate students in eight schools. These schools offer more than 50 liberal arts majors and professional degrees, such as law, architecture, construction management, and historic preservation. The university has a student to faculty ratio of 14:1 while almost half of the classes offered have less than 20 students.

The largest majors are business, management, and marketing (24%); architecture (10%); security, law enforcement, and related protective services (9%); communication and journalism (8%); and psychology (7%).

Roger Williams University has several degree programs that are unique:
 Marine Biology program: offers a B.S. in Marine Biology, which is one of about fifteen in the country.
 Architecture program: One of a few M. Arch. (Master’s of Architecture) in a traditional liberal arts environment.
 Historic Preservation program: the B.S. in Historic Preservation is one of seven offered in the country and the M.S. in Historic Preservation is one of about 35 offered in the country.
 Construction Management program: offers a B.S. in Construction Management (CM). RWU's Construction Management program is accredited by the American Council for Construction Education (ACCE) and a member of ASC's Northeast Region (Region 1).
 Law program: Only Juris Doctor available in Rhode Island; offers a Master of Studies in Law (MSL).

Student life

Approximately 63% of students live on campus. 88% of the students attend school full-time. About 14% have a family income of less than $40k. 75% of the student population is white, 5% is Hispanic, and 2% is African American; less than 1% of the students are from other races or ethnicities.

The university's campus newspaper, The Hawks' Herald, publishes approximately 20 issues per academic year. An FM radio station, WQRI 88.3, plays everything from college alternative to hip hop.  The college's 20 varsity athletic teams play at the Division III level as members of the Commonwealth Coast Conference.

Arts 
On September 21, 2017, music icons The Beach Boys were honored by Roger Williams University, and music historians Al Gomes and Connie Watrous of Big Noise, and plaques were unveiled to commemorate the band's concert on September 22, 1971 at the university's Baypoint Inn & Conference Center in Portsmouth, Rhode Island. The 1971 concert was the first-ever appearance of South African Ricky Fataar as an official member of the band and Filipino Billy Hinsche as a touring member, essentially changing the Beach Boys' live and recording act's line-up into a multi-racial group. Diversity is a credo of Roger Williams University, which is why the school chose to celebrate this moment in the band's history.

Athletics 
Roger Williams University teams participate as a member of the National Collegiate Athletic Association's Division III aside from the co-ed sailing team, which is Division I and is currently ranked number six in the sailing world's college rankings. Most of the Hawks are a member of the Commonwealth Coast Conference (CCC), except for the swimming and diving team, who compete in the New England Intercollegiate Swimming and Diving Association (NEISDA).

Men's sports include: 
 Baseball
 Basketball
 Cross country
 Golf
 Lacrosse
 Polo
 Soccer
 Swimming & diving
 Tennis
 Track & field
 Wrestling

Women's sports include:
 Basketball
 Cross country
 Field hockey
 Lacrosse
 Polo
 Soccer
 Softball
 Swimming & diving
 Tennis
 Track & field
 Volleyball

Co-ed sports include:
 Equestrian
 Sailing

The university does not have a track and field and therefore uses the nearby Portsmouth High School facility in Portsmouth, Rhode Island.

Reputation and campus culture

The university established a program in civil discourse, including the journal Reason and Respect, which brought in speakers such as Salman Rushdie, David Gergen, First Minister and Nobel Prize–winner David Trimble, Khaled Hosseini, author of Kite Runner, Bob Geldof of Live Aid, and others to campus.  The university has established campuses in London and Florence; collaborates with sister institutions in France, Brazil, Vietnam, and Hong Kong; features a broad portfolio of study-abroad opportunities encompassing over 30 countries; and is home to a Center for Macro Projects and Diplomacy, which brings together engineering, architecture, technology, economic development, and international relations for a common purpose. Furthermore, it was recently recognized as a non-governmental member of the United Nations.

Notable faculty members and alumni
 Tim Baxter, '83 chairman of the board, former president and CEO, Samsung Electronics North America
 Adam Braver, writer
 Roberto DaSilva, first mayor of East Providence, Rhode Island
 Jason Mattera, conservative blogger and writer.
 James W. Nuttall, United States Army major general who served as deputy director of the Army National Guard and deputy commander of the First Army
 Joe Polisena, former member of the Rhode Island State Senate and mayor of Johnston, Rhode Island
 Jerry Remy, Former Boston Red Sox broadcaster and MLB player
 Chris Sparling, screenwriter and director
 June Speakman, member of the Rhode Island House of Representatives
 Bob Wiley, former NFL offensive line coach

References

External links

 Official website
 Official athletics website

 
Architecture schools in Rhode Island
Buildings and structures in Bristol, Rhode Island
Education in Bristol County, Rhode Island
Educational institutions established in 1956
Private universities and colleges in Rhode Island
Tourist attractions in Bristol County, Rhode Island
1956 establishments in Rhode Island